Camille Becanne (7 August 1913 – 2 June 1979) was a French rower. He competed in the men's eight event at the 1936 Summer Olympics.

References

1913 births
1979 deaths
French male rowers
Olympic rowers of France
Rowers at the 1936 Summer Olympics